The following is a list of Michigan state game and wildlife areas found throughout the U.S. state of Michigan.  The state has a system of publicly owned lands managed primarily for wildlife conservation, wildlife observation, recreational activities, and hunting.  Some areas provide opportunities for camping, hiking, cross-country skiing, fishing, bird watching, bicycling, boating, and off-road vehicle trails.  Activities, as well as rules and regulations, vary among individual areas.

The Michigan Department of Natural Resources oversees the properties through subdivisions including the Forestry Division, Parks and Recreation Division, Grouse Enhanced Management System (GEMS), and the Wildlife Division.  Local municipalities may also enforce their own rules and regulations, and some portions may be private property.  Some units are managed cooperatively on the national level with the National Park Service, U.S. Fish and Wildlife Service, or U.S. Forest Service.  Depending on their purpose, the units are divided into four categories: state game areas, state wildlife management areas, state wildlife areas, and state wildlife research areas.  GEMS and designated waterfowl production areas are categorized as state wildlife management areas.

The smallest unit is the Mud Creek Flooding State Wildlife Management Area at only .

List

See also
 List of Michigan state parks
 Michigan Department of Natural Resources
 Protected areas of Michigan

External links
 Homepage for the Michigan Department of Natural Resources
 State Wildlife/Game Areas (list)
 Summary List of State Wildlife/Game Areas of the Michigan Department of Natural Resources

State game areas
Michigan